The second series of The Circle began on 24 September 2019 on Channel 4, with a live special hosted by Emma Willis, and concluded on 18 October 2019 after 22 episodes. The series was confirmed on 18 January 2019. Sophie Willan returned as narrator for the second season. The series launched with 1,975,000 viewers. It concluded with 1,209,000 viewers, which was a +67% increase on the first season's final number of viewers, and attracted the biggest share of 16-34 year old viewers from 10 to 11:35 p.m.

On 24 September 2019, it was announced that Richard Madeley would be taking part in the series as a special guest, and would be entering during the live launch. Viewers were then tasked with picking which persona he would be playing, ultimately choosing him to play as "Judy", a 27-year-old woman. He left the series during the seventh episode after successfully completing his mission to be blocked.

On 18 October 2019, the series was won by Paddy Smyth, who had played the game as himself. He won £70,000 of the total prize fund, with the remaining £30,000 going to Tim Wilson who won the "viewers champion" vote. Georgina Elliott was the runner-up of the series.

Format changes
This series was the first to include weekly live episodes, which are hosted by Emma Willis and airs instead of the regular episode on Fridays. Although it still features daily highlights, it also includes interviews with blocked players and celebrity guests dissecting the week's events. Emma also confirmed on the launch show that the prize fund had been increased this year taking it to £100,000, doubling the amount from the first series. The £100,000 would be split, with £70,000 going to the highest rated player and £30,000 going to the viewers' favourite finalist. Unlike the previous series, instead of the players rating each other out of 5 during each round, they are given the task of ranking each other from most to least favourite instead.

Players
The contestants taking part in the series were revealed on 23 September 2019.

Twists

Richard Madeley – "Judy"
Ahead of the launch, it was announced that television presenter Richard Madeley would be entering The Circle, with the viewers deciding which persona he would be playing. They chose for him to play as "Judy", a 27-year old woman. In Episode 5, Richard was tasked with becoming the most unpopular player and getting blocked at the next ratings. He successfully completed this task and, as a reward, was allowed to give one player immunity in the next ratings. He gave this to Georgina.

The Public – Ella and Kevin
During episode 4, the public were given the choice to vote for a new player to be added into The Circle. The viewers had the choice between Ella, 24, or Kevin, 23, to join the game as themselves. After the vote, it was revealed that Ella had won, and joined The Circle.

"Joyce"
Beth Dunlavey and Jack Quirk, who both joined The Circle as separate players in Episode 8, were the next twist decided by the public. After being blocked during Episode 11, having received the two lowest average ratings, they were then informed that the viewers had been voting for whether they should be blocked for good and be replaced by a brand new player, Ryan, playing secretly with his girlfriend, Lauren, or to continue in the game together, but join forces to play as one persona ("Joyce", a 62-year-old woman). The viewers voted for Beth and Jack to continue in the game as a team, and "Joyce" officially joined The Circle in Episode 12.

The Eggs – Andrea and Jan
During Episode 16, Andrea and Jan entered The Circle as anonymous players represented by coloured eggs. Andrea ("Red Egg") and Jan ("Blue Egg") had to participate in various tasks so the other players could vote for which of the two they would like to see join The Circle. Tim and Ella voted for "Red Egg", whilst Beth and Jack ("Joyce"), Busayo, Georgina, James, Paddy, and Woody voted for "Blue Egg". After the votes were tallied, the identities of the eggs were revealed. Having received the majority vote, Jan was introduced into The Circle; Andrea was immediately blocked, leaving the show just a few hours after arriving. Jan became the last player to enter The Circle.

Results and elimination
Unlike the previous series, players ranked each other from most to least favourite in order to determine the average ratings results.

Notes

References

Channel 4 reality television shows
2019 British television seasons
The Circle (franchise)